Kostelní Myslová is a municipality and village in Jihlava District in the Vysočina Region of the Czech Republic. It has about 70 inhabitants.

Notable people
František Mořic Nágl (1889–1944), painter

References

Villages in Jihlava District